Centro Escolar El Encino is a school in Aguascalientes, Mexico. It is a private Catholic school associated with Opus Dei. It has 3 academic levels: Primary, Middle School and High School. The school was founded by Daniel Rafael Ortega Matute on September 11, 1986. The current principal is Fernando Anchustegui Icaza. It counts with digital boards on every classroom and it has over 500 students in the three levels.

References

External links
 

Education in Aguascalientes
Educational institutions established in 1986
Private schools in Mexico
1986 establishments in Mexico